Qateh may refer to:
 Qateh, Chaharmahal and Bakhtiari